Dalyell is a surname.

Dalyell may also refer to:

Dalyell baronets
Tam Dalyell (1932–2017), Scottish Labour Party politician
Elsie Dalyell (1881–1948), Australian pathologist